Gene Sullivan (April 21, 1931 – February 21, 2002) was an American basketball coach and collegiate athletic director.

Sullivan grew up on the Northwest Side of Chicago and attended the University of Notre Dame. After serving with the United States Army in the Korean War, he became a boys' basketball coach at Loyola Academy in Wilmette, Illinois, and guided them to three Chicago Catholic League titles between 1957 and 1967. In 1967, he became an assistant coach to Johnny Dee at the University of Notre Dame, and hoped to succeed Dee as head coach. When Dee retired in 1971, however, the school hired Digger Phelps as head coach, and a disappointed Sullivan spent the next few years writing a basketball book and running a limousine company.

From 1975 to 1978, Sullivan worked as DePaul University's athletic director. He then became athletic director at Loyola University Chicago, and took over as men's basketball coach in 1980. In 1985, his Loyola Ramblers, led by Alfredrick Hughes, reached the Sweet Sixteen of the NCAA Division I men's basketball tournament, where they lost to Georgetown University–their deepest NCAA Tournament run in 31 years. Sullivan left Loyola in 1989 with a 149-114 career record.

Sullivan spent the next few years as head of recreational programs for the Chicago Park District. He later worked as director of an anti-gang youth program with the Cook County State's Attorney's office and as a radio analyst for DePaul basketball radio broadcasts. He died of a staph infection at age 70 in February 2002.

Loyola returned to the NCAA Tournament in 2018 for the first time since Sullivan's team made its 1985 appearance. The school honored the team in 2009.

Head Coaching Record 

Source:

References

1931 births
2002 deaths
American men's basketball coaches
Basketball coaches from Illinois
DePaul Blue Demons athletic directors
High school basketball coaches in the United States
Loyola Ramblers athletic directors
Loyola Ramblers men's basketball coaches
Notre Dame Fighting Irish men's basketball coaches
Sportspeople from Chicago
University of Notre Dame alumni